Aldham may refer to:

Aldham, Essex, England, United Kingdom
Aldham, Suffolk, England, United Kingdom
Aldham, Pennsylvania, a town in Pennsylvania, United States
Aldham, Yorkshire, on the Dearne and Dove Canal, England
Thomas Aldham (died 1660), English Quaker

See also
Aldham Robarts LRC, a library belonging to Liverpool John Moores University in Liverpool, England